Tumtum Peak is a  mountain summit located in the southwest corner of Mount Rainier National Park, in Pierce County of Washington state. The nearest higher neighbor is Mount Wow,  to the northwest, and Iron Mountain rises  to the northeast. Precipitation runoff from Tumtum Peak is drained by Tahoma Creek on the west side of the mountain, whereas Kautz Creek drains the east side, and both are tributaries of the Nisqually River. The Road to Paradise traverses the southern base of the peak shortly after visitors to the park enter via the Nisqually Entrance.

Etymology
The "tumtum" name derives from Chinook Jargon for a word meaning "heart, or heartbeat", and refers to the shape of the landform. The name was officially adopted in 1913 by the United States Board on Geographic Names.

Climate

Tumtum Peak is located in the marine west coast climate zone of western North America. Most weather fronts originate in the Pacific Ocean, and travel east toward the Cascade Mountains. As fronts approach, they are forced upward by the peaks of the Cascade Range (Orographic lift), causing them to drop their moisture in the form of rain or snowfall onto the Cascades. As a result, the west side of the Cascades experiences high precipitation, especially during the winter months in the form of snowfall. During winter months, weather is usually cloudy, but due to high pressure systems over the Pacific Ocean that intensify during summer months, there is often little or no cloud cover during the summer.

Gallery

See also

 Geology of the Pacific Northwest

References

External links
 National Park Service web site: Mount Rainier National Park
 Tumtum Peak: weather forecast
 Tumtum Peak photo: Flickr

Cascade Range
Mountains of Pierce County, Washington
Mountains of Washington (state)
Mount Rainier National Park
North American 1000 m summits
Chinook Jargon place names